Eulycia is a genus of moths in the family Geometridae described by Anthonie Johannes Theodorus Janse in 1932.

Species
Eulycia grisea Warren, 1897
Eulycia grisea apysta Prout, 1938
Eulycia grisea eugonia Prout, 1938
Eulycia accentuata Felder & Rogenhofer, 1875
Eulycia extorris Warren, 1904
Eulycia subpunctata Warren, 1897

References

Geometridae